Sybra maculicollis is a species of beetle in the family Cerambycidae described by Per Olof Christopher Aurivillius in 1927.

References

maculicollis
Beetles described in 1927